The American School in London (ASL) is a private, independent school in St John's Wood, London, England, for students from kindergarten through high school. The school's mission statement is: "The American School in London empowers each student to thrive as a lifelong learner and courageous global citizen by fostering intellect, creativity, inclusivity and character."

Many students have at least one parent with a U.S. passport, but the school's admissions policy stresses that the school tries to admit a diverse student body. The school takes children aged four through 18 and provides an education based in American pedagogy with an international perspective. The kindergarten classes are inspired by the Reggio Emilia method.

History
The school was established in 1951 by journalist Stephen Eckard. It was first situated in Eckard's home, and was a school primarily for 13 students. The school's colors, orange and black, are inspired by Eckard's alma mater, Princeton University. Prior to that, the school's official colors were red and black.

In 1964, the newly formed Board of Trustees made the landmark decision to raise funds for a $7 million building to house the whole school. They broke ground in 1968 with the help of David K.E. Bruce. The cornerstone was laid two years later by Ambassador Walter Annenberg. The Rt. Hon. Margaret Thatcher, MP, then Secretary of State for Education and Science, spoke at the building's dedication in 1971.

In September 2000, the School opened a new High School wing, which included an additional 24,000 square feet of space, a new gym, art studios, high-tech computer labs and a renovated library.

In June 2006, the School broke ground on the School Center for Education and the Arts, to create a 450-seat theater and new flexible teaching and performance space. The Center was completed in the winter of 2007 and officially opened in March 2008.

In 2011, the School marked its 60th anniversary by celebrating Founder's Day on 21 April, the date on which founding headmaster Stephen L. Eckard opened the doors of his Knightsbridge flat to begin the American School in London in 1951.

In May 2014, the School broke ground, once again, on the construction of a Community Arts Building (opened in January 2016); an underground Aquatic & Fitness Center with a 6-lane, 25-meter swimming pool, fitness center and multipurpose instruction space (opened September 2016); and the renovation of a middle school science labs (opened in September 2016). These new facilities provide an additional 26,000 square feet of teaching and learning spaces.

Visitors to the school have included U.S. Presidents Harry Truman, Ronald Reagan, Bill Clinton and Barack Obama during their visits to London.  At a visit to The American School In London, President Obama made a short speech in which he talked about the US-UK relationship and the importance of children as the future.

According to the Good Schools Guide, 80% of the 1,350 students hold United States passports, and half of those are multi-passport holders from dual national families.

A 2018 Ofsted inspection report rated ASL as "outstanding" in all fields inspected.

In 2021, The Head of the School Robin Appleby announced her resignation as the school had been accused of indoctrinating its pupils in critical race theory. In March 2022, the school was downgraded two ratings by Ofsted to "requires improvement". Ofsted had inspected the school following the reports of political indoctrination. While the school was found to give "strong importance to equality and inclusion", the report continued "Sometimes, however, teaching places much more weight on the school’s approach to social justice than on learning subject-specific knowledge and skills". Reporting on the teaching of humanities in the lower school, Ofsted found that pupils "spend much time repeatedly considering identity (including analysing their own characteristics) rather than learning, for example, geographical knowledge".

Current and former heads
Stephen Eckard, founder, head of school 1951–1971
Jack Harrison, head of school 1971–1986
William E. Harris, head of school 1986–1991
William Greenham, interim head of school 1991–1992
Judith L. Glickman, head of school 1992–1998
William C. Mules, head of school 1998–2007
Coreen R. Hester, head of school 2007–2017
Robin S. Appleby, head of school 2017–2021
Coreen R. Hester, head of school 2022–2023

Notable students
Devon Aoki, Japanese-American actress
Nina Axelrod, American actress
Stewart Copeland, American musician, drummer for The Police
R. Luke DuBois, American composer and artist
Cassie Mogilner Holmes, professor at UCLA Anderson School of Management
Steve-O, British American Canadian stunt performer and TV personality
Andrew Luck, NFL QB for the Indianapolis Colts.
Prabowo Subianto, Indonesian politician and former Lieutenant General 
Kathleen Turner, Hollywood actress, director, and two time Golden Globe recipient.
Marc Sessler, NFL Media personality and host of the Around the NFL podcast.
Charles Walker, Conservative British Member of Parliament for Broxbourne
 Stella Barey, adult actress

See also
 Americans in the United Kingdom

References

External links
Official website

1951 establishments in England
American international schools in the United Kingdom
Educational institutions established in 1951
Private co-educational schools in London
Private schools in the City of Westminster
International schools in London
St John's Wood